Steven G. Boxer is an American biophysical chemist currently the Camille Dreyfus Professor at Stanford University, a member of the National Academy of Sciences, and an elected fellow of the American Association for the Advancement of Science, American Academy of Arts and Sciences, Royal Society of Chemistry and Biophysical Society. He received many awards, including the NIH MERIT Award and the Earle K. Plyler Prize for Molecular Spectroscopy.

References

Year of birth missing (living people)
Living people
Fellows of the American Association for the Advancement of Science
Stanford University faculty
21st-century American physicists
Members of the United States National Academy of Sciences
Fellows of the American Academy of Arts and Sciences